, also known as "man-god" or "human deity," is a belief in Shinto in which humans are worshipped as gods during their lives or after their deaths. The term "Hitogami" is derived from the Japanese words "hito," meaning "human," and "kami," meaning "god." In Japan, this belief is also known as "ikigami" or "arahitogami," especially when the deity is a living person. This concept is distinct from the ujigami (Japanese: "guardian deity") belief system, which focuses on a deity's connection to a specific family or geographic origin. In contrast, the hitogami belief system emphasizes personal faith as the basis for membership in the circle of believers.

People who become human deities include sorcerers, priests, and others who possess special and unusual magical powers, tribal chiefs, kings, and others with superior skills, such as outstanding dancers, soldiers, and others, as well as physically disabled people, Confucian scholars, and foreign aliens who are different from ordinary people. In Japanese folk beliefs, human deities are diverse and can be divided into those who are deified during life and those who are worshipped as human deities after death.

The practice of deifying humans after death is a way to put to rest the legacy of those who have died with a grudge. Examples of the former include toya (head priests), miko (shrine maidens), and masquerading deities in the rituals of the miya-za. Throughout Japanese history, the hitogami and ujigami belief systems have interacted with one another. Examples of the hitogami belief system can be seen in the deification of heroes like Hachiman (god of war) and Tenjin (god of calligraphy), as well as in the ecstatic singing and dancing of Japanese festival processions, and in the charismatic leadership of some of Japan's "new religions."

In ancient societies, it was common for aristocrats who were defeated in political disputes to manifest their grudge as a curse after death and to offer sacrifices to gods in order to quell the curse.

This belief is prevalent in Japan and is known by various names such as "ikigami" or "arahitogami." People who become human deities include sorcerers, priests, kings, and others with special and superior skills, as well as physically disabled people, Confucian scholars, and foreign aliens who are different from ordinary people. The practice of deifying humans after death is a way to put to rest the legacy of those who have died with a grudge.

References 

Shinto
Shinto kami
Types of deities